The 22613 / 14 Sangrami Express is a Express train belonging to Indian Railways Southern Railway zone that runs between  and  in India.

It operates as train number 22613 from Chennai Central to Haldia and as train number 22614 in the reverse direction serving the states of Tamil Nadu, Andhra Pradesh, Odisha, and West Bengal.

Coaches
The 22613 / 14 Sangrami Express has one AC Chair Car, one AC 3-Tier, six Sleeper Class, six General Unreserved & two SLR (seating with luggage rake) coaches and two high-capacity parcel van coaches. It does not carry a pantry car.

As is customary with most train services in India, coach composition may be amended at the discretion of Indian Railways depending on demand.

Service

As the average speed of the train is slightly above , as per railway rules, its fare includes a Superfast surcharge.

The Train Is Permanently Cancelled

Routing

Traction
As the route is fully electrified, an Visakhapatnam-based WAP-4 locomotive powers the train to its destination.

References

Express trains in India
Transport in Haldia
Rail transport in Tamil Nadu
Rail transport in Andhra Pradesh
Rail transport in Odisha
Rail transport in West Bengal
Transport in Chennai
Named passenger trains of India